Humphrey House may refer to:

Grant-Humphreys Mansion, Denver, Colorado, listed on the National Register of Historic Places (NRHP)
John Humphrey House (Simsbury, Connecticut), NRHP-listed
Humphrey House (Evergreen, Colorado), listed on the NRHP in Jefferson County, Colorado
John Humphrey House (Orland Park, Illinois), NRHP-listed
Humphrey Place (Bedford, Kentucky), listed on the NRHP in Trimble County, Kentucky
Humphrey-McMeekin House, Louisville, Kentucky, listed on the NRHP in Jefferson County, Kentucky 
Humphrey House (Reno, Nevada), NRHP-listed
Friend Humphrey House, Colonie, New York, NRHP-listed
Humphrey-Williams House, Lumberton, North Carolina, NRHP-listed
Humphrey-Williams Plantation, Lumberton, North Carolina, NRHP-listed 
Herman L. Humphrey House, Hudson, Wisconsin, NRHP-listed

See also 
Humphry Marshall House
Humphreys House (disambiguation)
John Humphrey House (disambiguation)